Nothingface is the fifth studio album by Canadian heavy metal band Voivod. It was released by Mechanic/MCA Records on 1989. The album marked a change for the band, expanding their music into a more progressive metal sound. Several riffs are heavily influenced by Igor Stravinsky's "The Rite of Spring", specifically the centre section of "Pre-Ignition".

Critical reception

Nothingface is Voivod's most successful album to date, and their only album to enter the Billboard 200 charts, where it peaked at number 114. A music video made for the album's third track, a cover of Pink Floyd's "Astronomy Domine", received airplay on MTV's Headbangers Ball.

In 2005, Nothingface was ranked number 350 in Rock Hard magazine's book of The 500 Greatest Rock & Metal Albums of All Time. Loudwire named the album at number 23 in their list "Top 25 Progressive Metal Albums of All Time". Kerrang! described the album as a "prog-thrash masterpiece".

Track listing
All music written by Denis D'Amour, Jean-Yves Thériault and Michel Langevin, all lyrics by Denis Bélanger, except "Astronomy Domine" written by Syd Barrett.

Note: The original version combined the intro track and "The Unknown Knows" into one track. On later versions, both tracks were separated, with the intro track being either the first track or a pre-gap hidden track, which is followed by "The Unknown Knows".

Personnel
Voivod
Snake (Denis Bélanger) – vocals
Piggy (Denis D'Amour) – guitar
Blacky (Jean-Yves Thériault) – bass
Away (Michel Langevin) – drums, artwork

Production
Glen Robinson – producer, engineer, mixing
Benoit Lavallée, Rob Sutton – assistant engineers
Steve Sinclair – executive producer

References

1989 albums
Voivod (band) albums
MCA Records albums
Noise Records albums